The second edition of the Queen Elisabeth Music Competition, then known as Eugène Ysaÿe Competition, took place in Brussels from May 15 - May 31, 1938, and was the inaugural edition of its piano competition. It was won by Emil Gilels, whose sister Elizabeth had been awarded the 6th prize the previous year. 

Jean Absil composed his Piano Concerto op.30 for the competition.

A third edition devoted to orchestral conducting was scheduled for the following year, but due to the outbreak of World War II the competition's third edition didn't take place until 1951. Eventually, no conducting competition has taken place to date.

Palmares

Other competitors

  Nikita Magaloff
  Maurice Ohana

Jury
  Vytautas Bacevicius
  Samuil Feinberg
  Arthur Bliss
  Robert Casadesus
  Marcel Ciampi
  Jean Doyen
  Arne van Erpekum Sem
  Paul Frenkel
  Émile Frey
  Ignaz Friedman
  Walter Gieseking
  Siegfried Grundeis
  Bernard Heinze
  Léon Jongen
  Raoul Koczalski
  Artur Lemba
  Marcel Maas
  Carlo Van Neste
  Nikolay Orlov
  Pierre Petrides
  Jekabs Poruks
  Arthur Rubinstein
  Walter Rummel
  Emil von Sauer
  Victor Schiøler
  Andrei Stoyanov
  Olof Wibergh

References
  Queen Elisabeth Music Competition
  Thierry Bouckaert, Le rêve d'Élisabeth. Pages 33–37

02
May 1938 events
1938 in Belgium
1930s in Brussels